The Greengairs Landfill is a landfill site in Scotland that receives non-hazardous household, commercial and industrial waste from the North Lanarkshire area.  Greengairs was opened in 1990 and features landfill gas collection systems which are used to generate electricity for export into the National Grid.

The landfill is owned and operated by FCC Environment.

See also
Avondale Landfill

References

Landfills in the United Kingdom
Buildings and structures in North Lanarkshire
Environment of North Lanarkshire